Robert Figl (born 1 June 1967 in Karlsruhe) is a German wheelchair racer, who competes at the Olympic level. At the 2004 Olympic Games, he finished first in the demonstration sport of Men's 1500m wheelchair. However, he did not qualify for the final of the same event at the 2004 Paralympics, after getting involved in a collision in the semifinal. He also participated in the Paralympic Games, competing in five consecutive Summer Paralympics from 1988 to 2004 and winning a total of five gold, one silver, and six bronze medals. At the 2000 Summer Paralympics, he won two bronze medals in the 1500 metres and 4×400 metre relay.

References

Living people
1967 births
Sportspeople from Karlsruhe
Olympic wheelchair racers of Germany
German male wheelchair racers
Wheelchair racers at the 1988 Summer Olympics
Wheelchair racers at the 2004 Summer Olympics
Paralympic athletes of Germany
Paralympic athletes of West Germany
Athletes (track and field) at the 1988 Summer Paralympics
Athletes (track and field) at the 1992 Summer Paralympics
Athletes (track and field) at the 1996 Summer Paralympics
Athletes (track and field) at the 2000 Summer Paralympics
Athletes (track and field) at the 2004 Summer Paralympics
Paralympic gold medalists for Germany
Paralympic silver medalists for Germany
Paralympic bronze medalists for Germany
Paralympic wheelchair racers
Medalists at the 1988 Summer Paralympics
Medalists at the 1992 Summer Paralympics
Medalists at the 2000 Summer Paralympics
Olympic male wheelchair racers
Paralympic medalists in athletics (track and field)